Lew Hoad and Ken Rosewall were the defending champions, but Rosewall was ineligible to compete after turning professional.

Gardnar Mulloy and Budge Patty defeated Hoad and Neale Fraser in the final, 8–10, 8–6, 6–4, 6–4 to win the gentlemen's doubles tennis title at the 1957 Wimbledon Championship.

Seeds

  Neale Fraser /  Lew Hoad (final)
  Ham Richardson /  Vic Seixas (third round)
  Mal Anderson /  Ashley Cooper (quarterfinals)
  Nicola Pietrangeli /  Orlando Sirola (semifinals)

Draw

Finals

Top half

Section 1

Section 2

Bottom half

Section 3

Section 4

References

External links

Men's Doubles
Wimbledon Championship by year – Men's doubles